Mosonmagyaróvári KC SE is a Hungarian women's handball club. They currently play in the Nemzeti Bajnokság I (NBI), the top level championship in Hungary, after gained promotion in 2015.

Since they are sponsored by Samvardhana Motherson Group, the official name for the team is Motherson Mosonmagyaróvár.

Honours

Domestic competitions
Nemzeti Bajnokság I:
: 2020–21
Nemzeti Bajnokság I/B:
: 2017–18

Kits

Sports Hall information

Name: – UFM Aréna
City: – Mosonmagyaróvár
Capacity: – 1100
Address: – 9200 Mosonmagyaróvár, Gorkij utca 1.

Team

Current squad
Squad for the 2022–23 season

Goalkeepers
 21  Kitty Mistina
 31  Zsófi Szemerey
 77  Kíra Soltész
Wingers 
LW
 22  Zsófia Stranigg
 44  Fanni Csire
RW
 10  Kyra Sztankovics
 11  Petra Mihály
Line players
 18  Fruzsina Bardi
 20  Luca Faragó
 32  Noémi Pásztor

Back players
Left back
 2  Eszter Tóth
 29  Ines Ivancok
Centre backs
 7  Lara Babinszky
 33  Nikolett Tóth
 49  Patricia Kovács
 96  Gabriella Tóth 
Right backs
 6  Anna Albek
 28  Barbora Lancz

Transfers
Transfers for the 2023–24 season

 Joining
  Laura Udvardi (RW) (from  Kisvárdai KC) 
  Gréta Hadfi (GK) (from  Érd HC)
  Natalie Schatzl (LW) (from  Váci NKSE)

 Leaving
  Kitty Mistina (GK) (to  Moyra-Budaörs Handball) 
  Fanni Csire (LW) (to  Váci NKSE)

Staff members
  Chairman: Guntham Turner
  Professional director: 
  Head Coach: János Gyurka
  Coach: Ferenc Stranigg
  Technical Director: Szabó Ramóna, Dániel Miksó
  Physiotherapist: Edit Benkovics
  Club Doctor: Zoltán Várallyay MD

Notable former players

  Tamara Tilinger
  Flóra Katona 
  Gabriella Tóth
  Rita Lakatos
  Mónika Kovacsicz
  Zsófi Szemerey
  Ivett Szepesi
  Herczeg Lili
  Szederke Sirián
  Bernadett Horváth
  Szidónia Puhalák
  Júlia Hársfalvi
  Viktória Petróczi
  Bettina Dajka
  Ivett Kurucz
  Luca Dombi
  Monika Rajnohová
  Lucia Gubiková
  Réka Bíziková
  Simona Szarková
  Maria Holesova
  Karoline de Souza
  Tamires Morena Lima
  Jana Knedlíková
  Michaela Konečná
  Laura Popa
  Sara Vukcevic
  Lana Frankovic
  Sandra Filipović
  Ana Kojić
  Bojana Milić
  Irene Fanton

Coaches 

  Kálmán Róth (2014–2015)
  Tomáš Hlavatý (2015–2016)
  József Varga (2016–2017)
  Róbert Bognár (2017–2020)
 János Gyurka (2020–)

In European competition
Participations in EHF European League : 2x

References

Hungarian handball clubs
Handball clubs established in 2014
Mosonmagyaróvár